Tong Ka-po (born 17 March 1981) is a female tennis coach and former professional tennis player from Hong Kong.

Career
On 17 March 1981, Tong was born in Hong Kong.

By age 12, she was ranked number one in Hong Kong and ranked fifth in the world.

Tong featured in 32 ties for the Hong Kong Fed Cup team and represented her nation twice at the Asian Games.

As a singles player on the professional tour, Tong reached a best ranking of 236 and won three singles titles on the ITF Women's Circuit.

All of her main-draw appearances on the WTA Tour came in doubles, including quarterfinal appearances at the 2000 China Open and the 2001 Qatar Open. She had a career-high WTA doubles ranking of 154 and took part in the women's doubles qualifying draw at the 2001 Wimbledon Championships.

Tong now is a tennis coach and director at Modern Tennis Academy in Hong Kong.

ITF finals

Singles (3–0)

Doubles (6–2)

References

External links
 
 
 

1981 births
Living people
Hong Kong female tennis players
Tennis players at the 1998 Asian Games
Tennis players at the 2006 Asian Games
Asian Games competitors for Hong Kong